Live from Austin Music Hall is the first live album by Chris Tomlin, released in 2005. The album was recorded at Austin Music Hall on September 18, 2005. The Austin Music Hall was packed. The album was dedicated to the 2000 who were turned away at the door.

Track listing

Personnel
 Chris Tomlin – lead vocals, acoustic guitar,  piano
 Daniel Carson – electric guitars, background vocals
 Jesse Reeves – bass guitar, background vocals
 Travis Nunn – drums
 Ed Cash – acoustic guitar, mandolin, piano, background vocals, producer, mixing
 David Crowder – acoustic guitar and guest vocals on "This Is Our God"
 Seth Walker – guest vocals on "On Our Side"
 Cary Pierce – background vocals on "How Great Is Our God"
 Louie Giglio – executive producer
 Brad O'Donnell – executive producer
 David Habegger – mobile recording engineer
 Watermark Communications – mobile recording facility
 Russ Long – recording engineer
 Tommy Kinnard – house engineer
 Joseph Logsdon – assistant engineer
 Bob Ludwig – mastering
 Gateway Mastering, Portland, Massachusetts – mastering location
 Jess Chambers – A&R administration
 Holly Meyers – A&R administration
 Jan Cook – creative director
 Marcus Melton – art direction and design
 Kaysie Dorsey – photography

References 

Chris Tomlin albums
2005 live albums